Rowland Leigh (died by 17 June 1603) was the member of Parliament for Cricklade in the parliament of 1584.

References 

Members of the Parliament of England (pre-1707) for Cricklade
English MPs 1584–1585
Year of birth unknown
1600s deaths
Year of death uncertain